was a professional wrestling event promoted by World Wonder Ring Stardom. The event took place on July 23, 2022, in Nagoya at the Nagoya Congress Center, with a limited attendance due in part to the ongoing COVID-19 pandemic at the time.

Background
The Stardom in Showcase is a series of pay-per-views which mainly focuses on a diversity of gimmick matches, only different from the singles match stipulation. Billed as respiro shows, the main tagline of these events is "Anything can happen".

The show featured seven professional wrestling matches that resulted from scripted storylines, where wrestlers portrayed villains, heroes, or less distinguishable characters in the scripted events that built tension and culminated in a wrestling match or series of matches. The preshow matches were broadcast live on Stardom's YouTube channel.

Event
Dubbed as a non-canon event, the show started with the rumble match in which the two mystery competitors were represented by Stardom Super Strong Machine, impersonated by Saya Iida and Kaori Yoneyama who returned with her old Stars gimmick of Gokigen Death. She won the rumble by last eliminating Miyu Amasaki. In the second match, Maika & Himeka won after Maika threw Saya Iida over the top rope. The third match saw the Cosmic Angels members Unagi Sayaka, Mina Shirakawa, and Saki clash in a three-way "Cosmic rules" match. Referee Daichi Murayama declared the bout a no contest after Sayaka stripped Shirakawa off her swimwear. The next match saw the World of Stardom Champion and God's Eye leader Syuri defeating Hiragi Kurumi in an "I quit match", concluding an individual feud between the two, initiated by Kurumi weeks before the event. The next bout saw the High Speed Champion AZM, Tam Nakano, half of the Goddess of Stardom Champions Koguma, and one-third of the Artist of Stardom Champions Momo Watanabe clashing into a four-way falls count anywhere match. The confrontation was more comedic, with different items such as an inflatable dummy, a slide, and various other things being used. At a point in the match, Koguma and Nakano even switched ring attires. AZM won the match after driving Koguma into the titantron.

The main event portraited the confrontation of the Wonder of Stardom Champion Saya Kamitani, Starlight Kid, and a "reaper masked" silhouette in a casket match. The mysterious character was revealed to be Yuu from Sendai Girls' Pro Wrestling. She won the match by putting both Kamitani and Kid inside the casket. After the show went off, Stardom posted on Twitter a video of Rossy Ogawa raising from the casket and asking the reaper figure whether they will come back to the promotion or not.

Results

Rumble match entrances and eliminations
{| class="wikitable sortable"
|-
!Draw
!Entrant
!Orderelim.
!Eliminated by
!Elimination(s)
|-
| 1 || Mayu Iwatani || 7 || Mirai || 1
|-
| 2 || Super Strong Stardom Machine || 2 || Hazuki, Hanan & Mayu Iwatani || 1
|-
| 3 || Hazuki || 4 || Saki Kashima || 1
|-
| 4 || Momo Kohgo || 9 || Mirai || 0
|-
| 5 || Saki Kashima || 8 || Mirai || 3
|-
| 6 || Rina || 5 || Saki Kashima || 0
|-
| 7 || Hina || 1 || Super Strong Stardom Machine || 0
|-
| 8 || Hanan || 3 || Ruaka || 0
|- 
| 9 || Ruaka || 6 || Saki Kashima || 1
|-
| 10 || Lady C || 11 || Miyu Amasaki || 1
|-
| 11 || Miyu Amasaki || 12 || Gokigen Death || 1
|-
| 12 || Mirai || 10 || Lady C || 3
|- style="background: gold"
| 13 || Gokigen Death ||  || Winner || 1

Notes

References

External links
Page Stardom World

2022 in professional wrestling
World Wonder Ring Stardom shows
World Wonder Ring Stardom